Puya dasylirioides is a species in the genus Puya. This species is native to Costa Rica. It is unusual for a Puya, as the leaves have no spines along the leaf margins. The flowers are blue with brown buds and the plants reach maturity at 4 to 5 years. Another feature that sets this species is that it grows in boggy areas at 3000 m that dry up seasonably.

Cultivation
Puya dasylirioides comes from 2300 to 3300 meter elevation, where the climate is cool all year.  It has taken temperatures in the mid-80s (30 °C), but it's possible that it won't thrive in consistently warmer conditions, especially if nights are warm.  It is said to have taken winter lows of 19 °F (-7 °C), and might even handle colder temperatures. It grows well in a deep pot in normal cactus soil that contains no lime.  Water it deeply occasionally, and avoid letting the soil dry out completely.  Some protection from strong afternoon sun might be needed in warmer climates.  Over about 40% humidity is recommended.

References

External links

dasylirioides
Endemic flora of Costa Rica